Reaching Tin River (1990) is a novel by Australian author Thea Astley.  It won the 1990 New South Wales Premier's Literary Awards — Christina Stead Prize for Fiction.

Plot summary
Thea Astley's main character, Belle, is a quick witted, strong willed, rebellious and ambitious young woman. Belle tells an ironic story of her childhood and her obsession with a dead man. While researching the archives of a middle-of-nowhere town called Jericho Flats, she path crosses that of the long-dead, Gaden Lockyer, with whom she becomes obsessed.

Author's notes
Commenting on a scene in the book where Belle visits a country boarding house where Lockyer stayed, Astley stated: "About two or three years ago when I was passing an old seaside boarding house, the sort of place I've stayed at in country towns over and over again," she said, "and I thought I'd like to walk into that awful looking boarding house. If there was no-one around I'd sit there and wait. If anyone asked I'd say I was waiting for X, you know. If they hadn't sent for the police by evening I'd still be sitting there and saying I'm waiting for X. Eventually some absolutely ghastly person would come down the stairs and say, "I'm X." And then I thought, "This is wrong. It sounds like a thriller, you know, not my scene," but that's what started it off."

Reviews

 Ursula Perrin in The New York Times: "Every novel has a secret heart. It may be a faint heart, a bum heart, a cold heart. Ms. Astley's novel has a case of atrial fibrillation: its heart beats strongly but erratically. Much of the early writing is inflated, contorted; the ending seems to me a sham. And yet there's the journey, ah, the journey."
 Sandy Forbes in The Canberra Times: "Astley's prose crackles with wit and acerbic observation. Her outback towns seem to leach the pages; her observations about the upwardly mobile townies are just as dry."

References

External links
Middlemiss.org

1990 Australian novels
Novels by Thea Astley
Heinemann (publisher) books